Highway 322 is a highway in the Canadian province of Saskatchewan. It runs from Highway 20 near the Last Mountain House Provincial Park to Highway 220.

References

322